Vratko Nemanjić (fl. 1325–1355) was a Serbian noble, father of Prince Lazar's spouse Milica. Serbian epic poetry identifies him with Yug Bogdan ("South Bogdan") or Ljutica Bogdan ("Irate Bogdan"), a mythical hero in the Battle of Kosovo.

Biography
He was born in the beginning of the 14th century as the son of Vratislav Nemanjic, who held the title of Grand Župan, grandson of Dmitar Nemanjić, a descendant of Vukan Nemanjić. He was a noble and age-mate of Serb Emperor Stefan Dušan. In 1342, Vratko and Oliver, as allies of John VI Kantakouzenos in the Byzantine civil war of 1341–1347, led the Serbian army to attack Serres. The attack failed disastrously, as dysentery (caused by the excessive consumption of must) befell the attackers, and 1,500 men died of it.

He was the father of Milica, the wife of Prince Lazar. He must have been about 80 years old at the time of the Battle of Kosovo.

Endowments 

According to the Serbian epic poem "The girl Margit and the voevod Rajko", Yug Bogdan resided in Prokuplje. A folk tradition holds that the surrounding region Bogdanovac was named after him. The 14 meter tall Water Tower of the Prokuplje Fortress is popularly called "Bogdan's Tower".

Another tradition holds that Yug Bogdan owned wineyards in the village of Bogdanje (near Trstenik), and that the village was named after him.

Serbian epic poetry
In the Serbian epic poems, Yug Bogdan is the father of the Jugovići (nine Jugović brothers). One of his daughters Anđelija is married to Banović Strahinja, but was kidnapped by Ottoman vassal Vlah Alija. Strahinja asks Yug Bogdan if he and his brothers-in-law (the Jugovići) could rescue her, but Yug Bogdan refused, since Anđelija had slept with the Turk, and brought great shame to the family.

He was killed together with his nine sons by the eight pasha (the seven before him had been killed) of the Ottoman Empire during the Battle of Kosovo. Where he is said to have fallen there is today a monument with a large white cross standing and the inscription: "Honor to the ancestors who taught us how to create a great fatherland. We will guard it and agree that it is more difficult to guard than to acquire.

Critical historians have suggested Bogdan, a Macedonian magnate, brother of Dejan and Jovan Oliver, as the likely historical model of this hero. Bogdan is mentioned by John VI Kantakouzenos, while Laonikos Chalkokondyles has more details about him.

References

14th-century Serbian royalty
Generals of Stefan Dušan
People of the Serbian Empire
Medieval Serbian military leaders
Characters in Serbian epic poetry
Year of birth uncertain
Year of death uncertain